Embalmer is an American death metal band from Cleveland, Ohio.

Formation and early releases (1989–1992)
In 1989, Toby Wulff (bass/vocals), Roy Stewart (drums), and Mark Davis (guitar) formed the band, under the name Corpsegrinder.  They released their first demo, "Into The Oven" independently in 1991, having by that time changed their name to Embalmer. At the end of the recording of the demo, Scott Cunningham stepped in to play second guitar but was quickly replaced with Duane Morris. Late 1992 saw the departure of Wulff and Morris.

"Rotting Remains" to hiatus (1993–1997)
In 1993, the band independently released the "Rotting Remains" demo, with Roy and Mark of the original group, Rick Fleming (vocals), Brian Holmberg (bass), and Jocko Jermann (guitar) joining them.  In 1994, the demo caught the attention of Relapse Records and they began distributing it through their catalog. In late 1994, Holmberg left the band, first replaced by first the return of Wulff, and then later by Dave Phillips. In 1995, the band released the "There Was Blood Everywhere" EP on 7-inch vinyl through Relapse, containing four tracks.  Two years later they released a compilation album under the same name, which re-released "Rotting Remains" and "There Was Blood Everywhere" on one CD. In 1996, Dave Phillips left and was replaced by Greg Jucuum. In late 1997 Rick Fleming left and was replaced by Frank Walls. Shortly thereafter, the band went on hiatus, and would not return for eight years.

Reformation and new album (2005–2007)
Embalmer reformed in 2005 and began work on new material. The band at this point consisted of Roy, Rick, Mark, Jocko and newcomer Rob Lesniak. In early 2006, both Mark and Jocko left the band, leading to Don Wolff (lead guitar) joining the band, and eventually the return of Morris. In 2007, they played several shows.  Their album 13 Faces Of Death was released on October 13, 2006, through Potatohead Productions.

Tours, momentum and a new era (2013–present)
In 2012, vocalist Rick Fleming was fired from the band. Brian Baxter recruited longtime friend Paul Gorefiend to fill the vocal slot, and Joe Wunderle joined on bass.  In addition this lineup departed on the band's first tours of the United States. The band continues active to this day, with the album Emanations from the Crypt released on April 1, 2016, through Hells Headbangers Records.

In 2019, the band released a live in the studio album, Embalmed Alive.

As of January 2022, Embalmer's third album Pathways to Putrefaction is in the final stages of recording and will be released later in 2022.
The band is set to perform a handful of shows throughout 2022 with bands joining on varied dates such as Nunslaughter, Fully Consumed, Ignominous, and more.

Current lineup
Paul Gorefiend - vocals (2012–present)
Roy Stewart - drums (1989–1997, 2005–2007, 2011–present)
Dave Almendinger - bass (2020–present)
Brian Baxter - lead guitar (2011–present)
Don Wolff - lead guitar (2006–2009, 2015–present)

Former members
Toby Wulff - vocals/bass (1989–1992, 1995)
Joe Wunderle - bass (2012–2019)
Brian Baxter - lead guitar (2008–2015)
Dylan Gordon - guitar (2013–2014)
Rick Fleming - vocals (1993–1997, 2005–2012)
Frank Walls - vocals (1997)
Mark Davis - guitar (1989–1997, 2005–2006)
Jocko Jermann - guitar (1993–1997, 2005–2006)
Duane Morris - guitar (1991–1992, 2006–2008)
Scott Cunningham - guitar (1991)
Dave Phillips - bass (1995)
Greg Jucuum - bass (1996–1997)
Brian Holmberg - bass (1993–1994)
Daron Schmidt - bass (2009)
Lou Spencer - bass (2010–2012)
Tim Powell - drums (2007–2010)
Lee Andrews - drums (2007)

Discography

Demos and EPs
Into The Oven - (Demo 1991)
Taxidermist - (Live Demo 1992)
Rotting Remains - (Demo 1993)
There Was Blood Everywhere - (7-inch EP 1995/Compilation CD 1997 "Relapse Underground Series")
Promo 2009
Promo 2012
Promo 2013
"Emanations From the Crypt" track on Hell's Headbash 2 compilation album (2015)

Other releases
 There Was Blood Everywhere (Compilation) 1997
 13 Faces of Death 2006
 Collection Of Carnage 2012
 Emanations From The Crypt 2016

References

External links
 Embalmer on Facebook

American death metal musical groups
Heavy metal musical groups from Ohio
Musical groups established in 1989